Brugmansia suaveolens, Brazil's white angel trumpet, also known as angel's tears and snowy angel's trumpet, is a species of flowering plant in the nightshade family Solanaceae, native to south eastern Brazil, but thought to be extinct in the wild. Like several other species of Brugmansia, it exists as an introduced species in areas outside its native range. It is a tender shrub or small tree with large semi-evergreen leaves and fragrant yellow or white trumpet-shaped flowers.

Description
The flowers are usually white but may be yellow or pink and hang downward from fully pendulous up to nearly horizontal.

The Latin specific epithet suaveolens means “with a sweet fragrance”.

Taxonomy
First discovered by Alexander von Humboldt and Aimé Bonpland, Brugmansia suaveolens was first formally described and published by Carl Ludwig Willdenow in 1809 as Datura suaveolens. In 1823, Friedrich von Berchtold and Jan Presl transferred these to Brugmansia suaveolens. Local common names include Maikoa, Huanduc, Maikiua, Tompeta del jucio, Tsuaak, Toe, Wahashupa, Peji, Bikut, Ohuetagi, Ain-vai, Baikua, Canachiari, and Ishauna.
There are thousands of cultivated Brugmansia hybrids, and the majority have at least some B. suaveolens heritage.  Some of the more popular cultivars include 'Dr. Seuss', 'Frosty Pink' and 'Charles Grimaldi'.

Distribution and habitat
B. suaveolens was originally endemic to the coastal rainforests of south-east Brazil, where it grows below  along river banks and forest edges with warm temperatures, high humidity, and heavy rainfall.  As a result of human interaction with this species, it can now be found growing in residential areas throughout much of South America; and occasionally in Central America, Mexico, California, Greece and even in parts of Florida.

Ecology
Fragrant in the evenings to attract pollinating moths, they hang half-closed during the day, but return to their peak again in the evenings. 
Brugmansia have two main stages to their life cycle. It will not flower until after it has reached this fork, and then only on new growth above the fork. Cuttings taken from lower vegetative region must also grow to a similar height before flowering, but cuttings from the upper flowering region will often flower at a very low height.
One interesting example of plant/animal interaction involves the butterfly Placidula euryanassa, who uses Brugmansia suaveolens as one of its main larval foods. It has been shown that these can sequester the plant's tropane alkaloids and store them through the pupal stage on to the adult butterfly, where they are then used as a defense mechanism, making themselves less palatable to vertebrate predators.
The species is invasive in New Caledonia.

Uses
Flower extracts of the plant have shown pain-killing (antinociceptive) activity in mice. This antinociceptive activity may be related in part to benzodiazepine receptors.  B. suaveolens is included in the Tasmanian Fire Service's list of low flammability plants, indicating that it is suitable for growing within a building protection zone. The flowers and the seeds are also traditionally used in Rio Grande do Sul, southern Brazil, mixed
in water and ingested for its analgesic-like effect.  

Many South American cultures have been noted to use Brugmansia suaveolens ritually. The Ingano and Siona in the Putumayo region both use it as an entheogen. It is also used by some Amazonian tribes as an admixture to increase the potency of Ayahuasca. In some South American countries, it is known to be occasionally added to ayahuasca brews by malevolent sorcerers or bad shamans who wish to take advantage of unsuspecting tourists. Genuine shamans believe one of the purposes for this is to "steal one's energy and/or power", of which they believe every person has a limited stockpile.

Cultivation
Brugmansia are grown as ornamentals outdoors year-round in non-freezing climates around the world. They do not tolerate temperatures that fall significantly below  Like other large-leaved, fast-growing plants, they appreciate a little protection from the wind, as well as from the hottest afternoon sun. They like organically rich soil, frequent water, and heavy fertilizer when in full growth. Both woody and leafy tip cuttings are used to propagate Brugmansia, although thicker cuttings tolerate lower humidity. In northern climes they are often grown out in large containers and wintered over in non-freezing garages or basements. Alternatively they are suitable for a sunny conservatory. They may be trained as standards (with a single, straight trunk).

In cultivation in the UK this plant has gained the Royal Horticultural Society’s Award of Garden Merit.

Toxicity

Every part of Brugmansia suaveolens is poisonous, with the seeds and leaves being especially dangerous.
As in other species of Brugmansia, B. suaveolens  is rich in scopolamine (hyoscine), hyoscyamine, atropine, and several other tropane alkaloids.
Effects of ingestion can include paralysis of smooth muscles, confusion, delusions, tachycardia, dry mouth, constipation, visual and auditory hallucinations, mydriasis, rapid onset
cycloplegia, and death.

References

External links

Kemper Center
Botany Photo of the Day

suaveolens
Taxa named by Aimé Bonpland
Taxa named by Alexander von Humboldt